Hannover Concerts is a concert agency from Hanover. The company is considered one of the largest concert promoters in northern Germany.

History 
Hannover Concerts was founded in 1979 by Michael Lohmann and Wolfgang Besemer, who died in 2014. In 1982, the agency brought the Rolling Stones to Hanover, beating Hamburg. The concert by the English rock band was also the first open-air concert in the old Niedersachsenstadion.

In 1986, Lohmann and Besemer converted the Capitol from a cinema into a concert and party venue.

Activities 
The agency organises more than 400 events annually and operates, among others, the Theater am Aegi, the Capitol, the Gilde Parkbühne Hannover and the Swiss Life Hall. Supra-regional activities include the Papenburg Festival on the grounds of the Meyer Werft shipyard in Papenburg, the Mercedes Benz Open-Air in Bremen and other open-air concerts in Rostock, Wolfsburg, Hildesheim or Braunschweig.

Performances organised by Hannover Concerts have included Genesis, Michael Jackson, Marius Müller-Westernhagen, Tina Turner, Madonna, Pink Floyd Coldplay, Bruce Springsteen, U2, AC/DC, Rammstein, Guns n' Roses, Eminem, Helene Fischer, Depeche Mode, Pink, David Guetta and Robbie Williams.

In 2014, Nico Röger joined the management after the unexpected death of Wolfgang Besemer. In June 2018, there was an expansion of the management with Benjamin Chatton.

Notes

References

External links 
 
 Eintrag in der Unternehmensdatenbank der Region Hannover
 Artikel zum Tod Wolfgang Besemers mit Angaben zur Firmengeschichte auf rockszene.de

Companies based in Hanover